Gutha is a townsite in the Mid West region of Western Australia,  north of Morawa.

The first Europeans to pass through the Gutha area were government Assistant Surveyor Augustus Charles Gregory and Francis Thomas Gregory (both attached to the department of the Surveyor-General) and their brother Henry Churchman Gregory, on a public-private funded expedition to search for new agricultural land beyond the settled areas.

The district surveyor suggested the name "Muthingutha", the Aboriginal name of a nearby rockhole. This was shortened to Gutha by the Lands Department, and Gutha siding was established in 1915. It was gazetted as a townsite in 1914.

The surrounding areas produce wheat and other cereal crops. The town was a receiving site for Cooperative Bulk Handling until 1 February 2019.

References 

Towns in Western Australia
Shire of Morawa
Grain receival points of Western Australia